Events from the year 1987 in Denmark.

Incumbents
 Monarch - Margrethe II
 Prime minister - Poul Schlüter

Events

Undated

Sports

Badminton
 Triton BK Aalborg wins Europe Cup.
 15 March  Morten Frost wins gold in men's single and Kirsten Larsen wins gold in women's single at the 1987 All England Open Badminton Championships.

Cycling
 February – Johnny Weltz wins the Grand Prix d'Ouverture La Marseillaise.
 March – Rolf Sørensen wins the Tirreno–Adriatico cycle race in Italy.
 May/June – Johnny Weltz wins the Grand Prix de Plumelec-Morbihan.
 Danny Clark (AUS) and Tony Doyle (GBR) win the Six Days of Copenhagen sox-day track cycling race.
 Unknown date  Hans-Henrik Ørsted wins gold in Men's individual pursuit at the 1987 UCI Track Cycling World Championships.

Football
 14 October – Denmark qualifies for UEFA Euro 1988 in West Germany by defeating Wales in their last game in Group 6 of the UEFA Euro 1988 qualifying and thereby winning the group one point ahead of Czechoslovakia.

Swimming
 1623  Benny Nielsen wins a silver medal in  Men's 200 metre butterfly and a bronze medal in Men's 100 metre butterfly at the  1987 European Aquatics Championships

Births
 21 January – Lisbet Jakobsen, rower
 30 December – Jeanette Ottesen, swimmer

Deaths
 16 March - Johann Otto von Spreckelsen, architect (born 1929)
 14 December – Mogens Lassen, architect (born 1901)

See also
1987 in Danish television

References

 
Denmark
Years of the 20th century in Denmark
1980s in Denmark